Events in the year 2022 in Jamaica.

Incumbents 

 Monarch: Elizabeth II (until September 8), then Charles III
 Governor-General: Patrick Allen
 Prime Minister: Andrew Holness
 Chief Justice: Bryan Sykes

Events 
Ongoing — COVID-19 pandemic in Jamaica

 22 – 24 March – The Duke and Duchess of Cambridge toured Jamaica in celebration of the Platinum Jubilee of Elizabeth II.

 7 July – Jamaica reports its first case of monkeypox.
 8 September – Accession of Charles III as King of Jamaica following the death of Queen Elizabeth II.
 13 September – Charles III is officially proclaimed King of Jamaica by the Governor-General at King's House, Kingston.
 19 September – A National Day of Mourning occurs in Jamaica to mourn the passing of Elizabeth II, Queen of Jamaica.
 19 September – Governor-General Patrick Allen and Prime Minister Andrew Holness attend the funeral of Elizabeth II in London.
 2 October – Memorial services take place in parishes throughout Jamaica to mark the passing of Elizabeth II, Queen of Jamaica.

Deaths 

 1 February – Easton McMorris, cricketer (born 1935)
 3 March – Denroy Morgan, reggae musician (born 1945) 
 30 March – Nathaniel Ian Wynter, musician (born 1954)
 11 May – Barbara Gloudon, author (born 1935)
 23 May – Francis Tulloch, MP (born 1940)
 4 July – Mona Hammond, actress (born 1931)
 3 August – Roy Hackett, civil rights activist (born 1928)
 11 August – Marco Brown, politician (born 1927/28) 
 23 August – Winston Stona, actor (born 1940)
 8 September – Elizabeth II, Queen of Jamaica (born 1926)

References 

 
2020s in Jamaica
Years of the 21st century in Jamaica
Jamaica
Jamaica